The 2014 Quebec general election was held on April 7, 2014 to elect members to the National Assembly of Quebec. The incumbent Parti Québécois which had won a minority government in 2012 was defeated by the Quebec Liberal Party under Philippe Couillard who won a majority government of 70 seats, while the incumbent Parti Québécois finished second with 30 seats, becoming the first single-term government since Jean-Jacques Bertrand's Union Nationale government was defeated in 1970. Pauline Marois electoral defeat marked the shortest stay of any Quebec provincial government since the Canadian Confederation. It marked the lowest seat total for the Parti Québécois since 1989 and its smallest share of the popular vote since its inaugural run in 1970, as Premier Pauline Marois lost her own riding. The Coalition Avenir Québec under François Legault made minor gains in terms of seats despite receiving a smaller share of the popular vote than in the previous election. Québec solidaire won an additional seat, though co-spokesperson Andrés Fontecilla failed to win his riding. This election saw the return of the Liberals to power 2 years after their defeat in 2012. To date this is the last election where the Liberal Party won a majority of seats in the Quebec Assembly.

Summary

At the outset of the campaign, the Parti Québécois had a modest lead in the polls and appeared to have a realistic prospect of winning a majority government. However, the party's support rapidly collapsed after the party announced Pierre Karl Péladeau, the president and CEO of media conglomerate Quebecor, as a star candidate. Péladeau's conservative and anti-union business background was widely criticized as being at odds with the party's social democratic history; and his outspoken support for a third referendum on Quebec sovereignty quickly sidelined the issues — including the Charter of Quebec Values and the corruption allegations against the Liberals, the latter of which had contributed to the defeat of Jean Charest's government in the 2012 election — which the party had identified as its primary campaign themes, alienating many voters who had little desire to revive the sovereignty issue.

In March 2014, Premier Pauline Marois was accused of antisemitism by The Center for Israel and Jewish Affairs (CIJA) surrounding the statements made by party member Louise Mailloux. Mailloux had written statements equating the Jewish practice of circumcision to rape and claimed that halal and kosher food prices were kept high to fund religious activities abroad. She wrote that the money went to: “For the Jews, to finance Israel’s colonization in Palestinian territories? And for Muslims, to fund the Muslim Brotherhood, the Islamists who want to impose Islam worldwide?” Marois defended Mailloux, denying antisemitism within the party and stated that she had "very good relations with the leaders of this community and the leaders of all the different communities in Quebec.” CIJA claimed Marois's apology and statements were inadequate and "meaningless excuses" with CIJA Quebec vice-president, Luciano Del Negro, stating: "She alleges a misunderstanding and refuses to basically recognize her views are not only offensive, but anti-Semitic in nature.”

Timeline (2012-2014)

Seat changes

Changes of party leaders

Other developments

Incumbent MNAs who did not run for re-election

Results

Summary analysis

Pairing off the top three parties, swings were calculated to be:

 PQ to Liberal: 8.45%
 CAQ to Liberal: 7.16%
 PQ to CAQ: 1.29%

Detailed analysis

|- style="background-color:#CCCCCC;"
! rowspan="2" colspan="2" style="text-align:left;" | Party
! rowspan="2" style="text-align:left;" | Party leader
! rowspan="2" style="font-size:80%;" | Candidates
! colspan="5" style="text-align:center;" | Seats
! colspan="3" style="text-align:center;" | Popular vote
|- style="background-color:#CCCCCC;text-align:center;"
| 2012
| style="font-size:80%;" | Dissol.
| 2014
| style="font-size:80%;" | Change
| %
| style="font-size:80%;" | Number
| %
| style="font-size:80%;" | Change (pp)

| style="text-align:left;" | Philippe Couillard
| 125
| 50
| 49
| 70
| +21
| 56.00
| 1,757,071
| 41.52
| +10.32

| style="text-align:left;" | Pauline Marois
| 124
| 54
| 54
| 30
| -24
| 24.00
| 1,074,120
| 25.38
| -6.57

| style="text-align:left;" | François Legault
| 122
| 19
| 18
| 22
| +4
| 17.60
| 975,607
| 23.05
| -4.00

| style="text-align:left;" | Françoise David, Andrés Fontecilla†
| 124
| 2
| 2
| 3
| +1
| 2.40
| 323,124
| 7.63
| +1.60

| style="text-align:left;" | Sol Zanetti
| 116
| —
| —
| —
| —
| —
| 30,697
| 0.73
| -1.16

| style="text-align:left;" | Alex Tyrrell
| 44
| —
| —
| —
| —
| —
| 23,163
| 0.55
| -0.44

| style="text-align:left;" | Adrien Pouliot
| 59
| —
| —
| —
| —
| —
| 16,429
| 0.39
| +0.21

| colspan="2" style="text-align:left;" | Independent
| 11
| —
| 2
| —
| —
| —
| 15,361
| 0.36
| +0.09

| style="text-align:left;" | Renaud Blais
| 24
| —
| —
| —
| —
| —
| 7,539
| 0.18
| +0.12

| style="text-align:left;" | Hugô St-Onge
| 14
| —
| —
| —
| —
| —
| 2,690
| 0.06
| +0.05

| style="text-align:left;" | Pierre Chénier
| 24
| —
| —
| —
| —
| —
| 2,016
| 0.05
| ±0.00

| style="text-align:left;" | Patricia Domingos
| 5
| —
| —
| —
| —
| —
| 1,645
| 0.04
| +0.04

| style="text-align:left;" | Frank Malenfant
| 5
| —
| —
| —
| —
| —
| 1,291
| 0.03
| -0.09††

| style="text-align:left;" | Claude Dupré
| 6
| *
| —
| —
| *
| —
| 521
| 0.01
| *

| style="text-align:left;" | Guy Boivin
| 5
| —
| —
| —
| —
| —
| 400
| 0.01
| -0.04

| style="text-align:left;" | Paul Biron
| 3
| —
| —
| —
| —
| —
| 241
| 0.01
| -0.02

| style="text-align:left;" | Robert Genesse
| 1
| —
| —
| —
| —
| —
| 163
| 0.00
| -0.01

| style="text-align:left;" | Michel Lepage
| 1
| —
| —
| —
| —
| —
| 126
| 0.00
| -0.03

| style="text-align:left;" | Marc-André Lacroix
| 1
| —
| —
| —
| —
| —
| 58
| 0.00
| -0.05
|- style="background-color:#e9e9e9;"
| colspan="3" style="text-align:left;" | Total
| 814
| 125
| 125
| 125
| 0
| 100.00
| 4,232,262
| 100.00
| 
|-
| colspan="9" style="text-align:left;" | Valid ballots
| 4,232,262
| 98.54
| -0.24
|-
| colspan="9" style="text-align:left;" | Rejected ballots
| 62,793
| 1.46
| +0.24
|-
| colspan="9" style="text-align:left;" | Voter turnout
| 4,295,055
| 71.44
| -3.16
|-
| colspan="9" style="text-align:left;" | Registered electors
| 6,012,440
| colspan="2" |
|}
Notes:
† The party designates David and Fontecilla as co-spokespeople. The party's power is held by the general meetings of the members and a board of 16 directors; the de jure leader recognized by the Chief Electoral Officer of Quebec (DGE) is Pierre-Paul St-Onge.
†† Party contested the 2012 election under the name Coalition pour la constituante.
* Party did not nominate candidates in the previous election.

Opinion polls

Results among "likely voters"

Pre-campaign period

List of candidates

Bas-Saint-Laurent and Gaspésie–Îles-de-la-Madeleine

|-
|bgcolor=whitesmoke|Bonaventure
||
|Sylvain Roy
|
|Damien Arsenault
|
|Jean-Marc Landry
|
|Patricia Chartier
|
|Louis-Patrick St-Pierre
|
|Patrick Dubois (Nul)
||
|Sylvain Roy
|-
|bgcolor=whitesmoke|Côte-du-Sud
|
|André Simard
||
|Norbert Morin
|
|Mireille Caron
|
|Simon Côté
|
|Joël Leblanc-Lavoie
|
|Renaud Blais (Nul)
Gaétan Mercier (Cons.)
||
|Norbert Morin
|-
|bgcolor=whitesmoke|Gaspé
||
|Gaétan Lelièvre
|
|Annie St-Onge
|
|Yvan Blanchard
|
|Daniel Leboeuf
|
|Frédérick Deroy
|
|Catherine Beau-Ferron (Nul)
Christian Rioux (Cons.)
||
|Gaétan Lelièvre
|-
|bgcolor=whitesmoke|Îles-de-la-Madeleine
|
|Jeannine Richard
||
|Germain Chevarie
|
|Mario-Michel Jomphe
|
|Natalia Porowska
|
|David Boudreau
|
|
||
|Jeannine Richard
|-
|bgcolor=whitesmoke|Matane-Matapédia
||
|Pascal Bérubé
|
|Dave Gravel
|
|Yann Gobeil-Nadon
|
|Gérald Tremblay
|
|Joëlle Vadeboncoeur Harrison
|
|
||
|Pascal Bérubé
|-
|bgcolor=whitesmoke|Rimouski
||
|Harold LeBel
|
|Pierre Huot
|
|Steven Fleurent
|
|Marie-Neige Besner
|
|Pierre Beaudoin
|
|Tom-Henri Cyr (Pot)
Pier-Luc Gagnon (Nul)
||
|Irvin Pelletier
|-
|bgcolor=whitesmoke|Rivière-du-Loup–Témiscouata
|
|Michel Lagacé
||
|Jean D'Amour
|
|Charles Roy
|
|Louis Gagnon
|
|Étienne Massé
|
|Frank Malenfant (PDSP)
||
|Jean D'Amour
|-
|}

Saguenay–Lac-Saint-Jean and Côte-Nord

|-
|bgcolor=whitesmoke|Chicoutimi
||
|Stéphane Bédard
|
|Michel Mallette
|
|Jean-François Doyon
|
|Réjean Godin
|
|Philippe Gosselin
|
|Marc Pettersen (Ind.)
||
|Stéphane Bédard
|-
|bgcolor=whitesmoke|Dubuc
|
|Jean-Marie Claveau
||
|Serge Simard
|
|Claudie Emond
|
|Marie-Lise Chrétien-Pineault
|
|Ariane Belva
|
|Pascal Tremblay (Ind.)
||
|Jean-Marie Claveau
|-
|bgcolor=whitesmoke|Duplessis
||
|Lorraine Richard
|
|Laurence Méthot
|
|Christine Pinard
|
|Jacques Gélineau
|
|Yan Rivard
|
|Alexandre LeBlanc (Cons.)
||
|Lorraine Richard
|-
|bgcolor=whitesmoke|Jonquière
||
|Sylvain Gaudreault
|
|Tommy Pageau
|
|Mélanie Boucher
|
|Réjean Dumais
|
|Nicolas Beaulieu
|
|
||
|Sylvain Gaudreault
|-
|bgcolor=whitesmoke|Lac-Saint-Jean
||
|Alexandre Cloutier
|
|Pascal Gagnon
|
|Elise Marchildon
|
|Frédérick Plamondon
|
|Sabrina Fauteux-Aïmola
|
|Francis Dubé (Nul)
Yann Lavoie (Cons.)
||
|Alexandre Cloutier
|-
|bgcolor=whitesmoke|René-Lévesque
||
||Marjolain Dufour
|
|Michel Lévesque
|
|Marie-Christine Fortin-Morand
|
|Marie-Pierre Clavette
|
|Nicolas Boivin Ringuette
|
|
||
|Marjolain Dufour
|-
|bgcolor=whitesmoke|Roberval
|
|Denis Trottier
||
|Philippe Couillard
|
|François Truchon
|
|Guillaume Néron
|
|Luc-Antoine Cauchon
|
|Julie Boucher (PDSP)
||
|Denis Trottier
|}

Capitale-Nationale

|-
|bgcolor=whitesmoke|Charlesbourg
|
|Dominique Payette
||
|François Blais
|
|Denise Trudel
|
|Marie Céline Domingue
|
|Guillaume Cyr
|
|Milan Jovanovic
|
|Sylvain Fiset (Nul)
Normand Fournier (M-L)
Daniel Lachance (UN)
||
|Denise Trudel
|-
|bgcolor=whitesmoke|Charlevoix–Côte-de-Beaupré
|
|Pauline Marois
||
|Caroline Simard
|
|Ian Latrémouille
|
|Jean-Yves Bernard
|
|François Thériault
|
|Chantal Melançon
|
|
||
|Pauline Marois
|-
|bgcolor=whitesmoke|Chauveau
|
|Christian Robitaille
|
|Bernard Chartier
||
|Gérard Deltell
|
|Jean-Claude Bernheim
|
|Sophie Leblanc
|
|Julie Plamondon
|
|
||
|Gérard Deltell
|-
|bgcolor=whitesmoke|Jean-Lesage
|
|Pierre Châteauvert
||
|André Drolet
|
|Émilie Foster
|
|Sébastien Bouchard
|
|Sol Zanetti
|
|Andrés Garcia
|
|José Breton (Ind.)
Sébastien Dumais (Nul)
Claude Moreau (M-L)
||
|André Drolet
|-
|bgcolor=whitesmoke|Jean-Talon
|
|Clément Laberge
||
|Yves Bolduc
|
|Hugues Beaulieu
|
|Eveline Gueppe
|
|Alexandre Lavallée
|
|Monique Roy Verville
|
|Maxime Couillard (Nul)
Stéphane Pouleur (Auto.)
||
|Yves Bolduc
|-
|bgcolor=whitesmoke|La Peltrie
|
|Paule Desgagnés
|
|France Gagnon
||
|Éric Caire
|
|Alexandre Jobin-Lawler
|
|Éric Belleau
|
|Thomas Pouliot
|
|Camille Dion-Garneau (Auto.)
||
|Éric Caire
|-
|bgcolor=whitesmoke|Louis-Hébert
|
|Patrice Dallaire
||
|Sam Hamad
|
|Mario Asselin
|
|Pascal Minville
|
|Patrick Côté
|
|Dany Bergeron
|
|
||
|Sam Hamad
|-
|bgcolor=whitesmoke|Montmorency
|
|Michel Guimond
||
|Raymond Bernier
|
|Michelyne St-Laurent
| 
|Jean-Pierre Duchesneau
|
|Jean Bouchard
|
|Adrien Pouliot
|
|Marielle Parent (Green)
||
|Michelyne St-Laurent
|-
|bgcolor=whitesmoke|Portneuf
|
|Hugues Genois
||
|Michel Matte
|
|Jacques Marcotte
|
|Catherine Côté
|
|Stéphanie Grimard
|
|Daniel Beaulieu
|
|
||
|Jacques Marcotte
|-
|bgcolor=whitesmoke|Taschereau
||
|Agnès Maltais
|
|Florent Tanlet
|
|Steve Brabant
|
|Marie-Ève Duchesne
|
|Catherine Dorion
|
|Anne Deblois
|
|Guy Boivin (Auto.)
Sylvain Drolet (PDSP)
Jean-Luc Savard (Nul)
||
|Agnès Maltais
|-
|bgcolor=whitesmoke|Vanier-Les Rivières
|
|Marc Dean
||
|Patrick Huot
|
|Sylvain Lévesque
|
|Monique Voisine
|
|Mathieu Fillion
|
|Jean-Alex Martin
|
|
||
|Sylvain Lévesque
|}

Mauricie

|-
|bgcolor=whitesmoke|Champlain
|
|Noëlla Champagne
||
|Pierre-Michel Auger
|
|Andrew D'Amours
|
|Lucie Favreau
|
|Nicolas Lavigne-Lefebvre
|
|Tomy Lachapelle (Cons.)
||
|Noëlla Champagne
|-
|bgcolor=whitesmoke|Laviolette
|
|André Beaudoin
||
|Julie Boulet
|
|Sylvain Gauthier
|
|Jean-François Dubois
|
|Gabriel Olivier Clavet-Massicotte
|
|Jean-Paul Bédard (M-L)
||
|Julie Boulet
|-
|bgcolor=whitesmoke|Maskinongé
|
|Patrick Lahaie
||
|Marc Plante
|
|Martin Poisson
|
|Linda Delmé
|
|Dany Brien
|
|Laurence J. Requilé (Équit.)
François-Xavier Richmond (MPLQ)

Jimmy Thibodeau (Nul)
||
|Jean-Paul Diamond
|-
|bgcolor=whitesmoke|Saint-Maurice
|
|Luc Trudel
||
|Pierre Giguère
|
|Stéphane Mongeau
|
|Marie-Line Audet
|
|Jean Guillemette
|
|Jonathan Lapointe (Cons.)
||
|Luc Trudel
|-
|bgcolor=whitesmoke|Trois-Rivières
|
|Alexis Deschênes
||
|Jean-Denis Girard
|
|Diego Brunelle
|
|Jean-Claude Landry
|
|André de Repentigny
|
|Pierre-Louis Bonneau (Cons.)
||
|Danielle St-Amand
|}

Estrie

|-
|bgcolor=whitesmoke|Mégantic
|
|Isabelle Hallé
||
|Ghislain Bolduc
|
|Pierre-Luc Boulanger
|
|Ludovick Nadeau
|
|Évelyne Beaudin
|
|
|
|
||
|Ghislain Bolduc
|-
|bgcolor=whitesmoke|Orford
|
|Michel Breton
||
|Pierre Reid
|
|Marc-Alexandre Bourget
|
|Patricia Tremblay
|
|Denis Spick
|
|
|
|
||
|Pierre Reid
|-
|bgcolor=whitesmoke|Richmond
|
|Étienne-Alexis Boucher
||
|Karine Vallières
|
|Alain Dion
|
|Colombe Landry
|
|Vincent Proulx
|
|Dave Côté
|
|Aurélie Dion-Fontaine (Green)
||
|Karine Vallières
|-
|bgcolor=whitesmoke|Saint-François
|
|Réjean Hébert
||
|Guy Hardy
|
|Gaston Stratford
|
|André Poulin
|
|Étienne Boudou-Laforce
|
|Marcel Collette
|
|Vincent J. Carbonneau (Green)
Philippe Lafrance (Pot)
Lionel Lambert (UN)
||
|Réjean Hébert
|-
|bgcolor=whitesmoke|Sherbrooke
|
|Serge Cardin
||
|Luc Fortin
|
|Philippe Girard
|
|Hélène Pigot
|
|Jean-Simon Campbell
|
|François Drogue
|
|Jeremy Andrews (Green)
Hubert Richard (n.d.)
Jossy Roy (Pot)
||
|Serge Cardin
|-
|}

Montréal

East

|-
|bgcolor=whitesmoke|Anjou–Louis-Riel
|
|Yasmina Chouakri
||
|Lise Thériault
|
|Richard Campeau
|
|Marlène Lessard
|
|Raphael Couture
|
|Annibal Teclou
|
|
||
|Lise Thériault
|-
|bgcolor=whitesmoke|Bourassa-Sauvé
|
|Leila Mahiout
||
|Rita de Santis
|
|Fabrizio Del Fabbro
|
|Claude Généreux
|
|Félix Luthu
|
|Adam Aberra
|
|Jean-François Brunet (Pot)
||
|Rita de Santis
|-
|bgcolor=whitesmoke|Bourget
||
|Maka Kotto
|
|Jean-Pierre Gagnon
|
|Sylvain Medza
|
|Gaétan Châteauneuf
|
|Diego Saavedra Renaud
|
|Thomas Lapierre
|
|Claude Brunelle (M-L)
||
|Maka Kotto
|-
|bgcolor=whitesmoke|Crémazie
|
|Diane De Courcy
||
|Marie Montpetit
|
|Sylvain Bessette
|
|André Frappier
|
|Gabrielle Ladouceur-Despins
|
|Virginia Leurent-Bonnevie
|
|
||
|Diane De Courcy
|-
|bgcolor=whitesmoke|Gouin
|
|Louise Mailloux
|
|Cheraquie Auguste-Constant
|
|Paul Franche
||
|Françoise David
|
|Olivier Lacelle
|
|
|
|Marc Boulanger (Nul)
||
|Françoise David
|-
|bgcolor=whitesmoke|Hochelaga-Maisonneuve
||
|Carole Poirier
|
|David Provencher
|
|Brendan Walsh
|
|Alexandre Leduc
|
|Simon Marchand
|
|Malcolm Lewis-Richmond
|
|Justin Canning (Nul)
Christine Dandenault (M-L)
Etienne Mallette (Pot)
||
|Carole Poirier
|-
|bgcolor=whitesmoke|Jeanne-Mance–Viger
|
|Joanie Harnois
||
|Filomena Rotiroti
|
|Mario Parent
|
|Stéphanie Charpentier
|
|
|
|Melissa Miscione
|
|Garnet Colly (M-L)
||
|Filomena Rotiroti
|-
|bgcolor=whitesmoke|LaFontaine
|
|Mathieu Pelletier
||
|Marc Tanguay
|
|Julie Di Battista Manseau
|
|Véronique Martineau
|
|Geneviève Dao Phan
|
|Benoit Drouin
|
|Yves Le Seigle (M-L)
||
|Marc Tanguay
|-
|bgcolor=whitesmoke|Laurier-Dorion
|
|Pierre Céré
||
|Gerry Sklavounos
|
|Valérie Assouline
|
|Andrés Fontecilla
|
|Miguel Tremblay
|
|Jeremy Tessier
|
|Peter Macrisopoulos (M-L)
Hugô St-Onge (Pot)
||
|Gerry Sklavounos
|-
|bgcolor=whitesmoke|Mercier
|
|Sylvie Legault
|
|Richard Sagala
|
|Alain Clavet
||
|Amir Khadir
|
|Martin Servant
|
|
|
|Hate's Deslandes (Pot)
Roger Hughes (Ind.)
||
|Amir Khadir
|-
|bgcolor=whitesmoke|Pointe-aux-Trembles
||
|Nicole Léger
|
|Claude Blais
|
|Mathieu Binette
|
|Natacha Larocque
|
|Camille Goyette-Gingras
|
|David Cox
|
|Louis Chandonnet (Auto.)
Geneviève Royer (M-L)
||
|Nicole Léger
|-
|bgcolor=whitesmoke|Rosemont
||
|Jean-François Lisée
|
|Thiery Valade
|
|Carl Dubois
|
|Jean Trudelle
|
|Sophie-Geneviève Labelle
|
|Ksenia Svetoushkina
|
|Matthew Babin (Pot)
Stéphane Chénier (M-L)
||
|Jean-François Lisée
|-
|bgcolor=whitesmoke|Sainte-Marie–Saint-Jacques
|
|Daniel Breton
|
|Anna Klisko
|
|Patrick Thauvette
||
|Manon Massé
|
|Nic Payne
|
|Stewart Wiseman
|
|Marc Bissonnette (Pot)
Serge Lachapelle (M-L)
||
|Daniel Breton
|-
|bgcolor=whitesmoke|Viau
|
|Odette Lavigne
||
|David Heurtel
|
|Wilner Cayo
|
|Geneviève Fortier-Moreau
|
|Benjamin Michaud
|
|Marijo Bourgault
|
|Ana Da Silva (Pot)
Benoit Valiquette (Nul)
||
|David Heurtel
|-
|}

West

|-
|bgcolor=whitesmoke|Acadie
|
|Évelyne Abitbol
||
|Christine St-Pierre
|
|Serge Pourreaux
|
|Geneviève Dick
|
|Julie Boivin
|
|Alix Nyaburerwa 
|
|Yvon Breton (M-L)
||
|Christine St-Pierre
|-
|bgcolor=whitesmoke|D'Arcy-McGee
|
|Éliane Pion
||
|David Birnbaum
|
|Elizabeth Smart
| 
|Suzanne Dufresne
|
|
|
|Abraham Weizfeld 
|
|
||
|Lawrence Bergman
|-
|bgcolor=whitesmoke|Jacques-Cartier
|
|Laurence Desroches
||
|Geoffrey Kelley
|
|Denis Deguire
|
|Jean-François Belley
|
|
|
|James Maynard
|
|Louis-Charles Fortier (Cons.)
||
|Geoffrey Kelley
|-
|bgcolor=whitesmoke|Marguerite-Bourgeoys
|
|Richard Leboeuf-McGregor
||
|Robert Poëti
|
|Zoubir Bouchaala
|
|Alexandre Émond
|
|Myriam Drouin
|
|Stéphanie Stevenson 
|
| 
||
|Robert Poëti
|-
|bgcolor=whitesmoke|Marquette
|
|Élisabeth Fortin
||
|François Ouimet
|
|Marc Thériault
|
|Marie-France Raymond-Dufour
|
|Maude Paquette
|
|John Symon
|
|Thierry Bisaillon-Roy (Nul)
Pierre Ennio Crespi (Cons.)
||
|François Ouimet
|-
|bgcolor=whitesmoke|Mont-Royal
|
|Audrey Beauséjour
||
|Pierre Arcand
|
|Jamilla Leboeuf
|
|Roy Semak
|
|
|
|Darryl L Giraud 
|
|Hélène Floch (Cons.)
Diane Johnston (M-L)
||
|Pierre Arcand
|-
|bgcolor=whitesmoke|Nelligan
|
|Louis-David Bénard
||
|Martin Coiteux
|
|Albert Bitton
|
|
|
|François Landry
|
|Charles Bourassa 
|
| Trevor Pinto (Cons.)
||
|Yolande James
|-
|bgcolor=whitesmoke|Notre-Dame-de-Grâce
|
|Olivier Sirard
||
|Kathleen Weil
|
|Noah Sidel
|
|Annick Desjardins
|
|
|
|Alex Tyrrell
|
|Rachel Hoffman (M-L)
||
|Kathleen Weil
|-
|bgcolor=whitesmoke|Outremont
|
|Roxanne Gendron
||
|Hélène David
|
|Rébecca McCann
|
|Édith Laperle
|
|Galia Vaillancourt
|
|Théo Brière
|
|Mathieu Marcil (Nul)
Simon Pouliot (Cons.)
||
|Philippe Couillard
|-
|bgcolor=whitesmoke|Robert-Baldwin
|
|Michaël Comtois-Lussier
||
|Carlos Leitão
|
|Jamie Allen
|
|Ali Faour
|
|Viviane Martinova-Croteau
|
|Mathieu Mireault 
|
|Patricia Popert (Cons.)
||
|Pierre Marsan
|-
|bgcolor=whitesmoke|Saint-Henri–Sainte-Anne
|
|Véronique Fournier
||
|Marguerite Blais
|
|Louis-Philippe Boulanger
|
|Molly Alexander
|
|Étienne Forest
|
|Sharon Sweeney
|
|Anna Kruzynski (Nul) 
Jairo Gaston Sanchez (Pot)
||
|Marguerite Blais
|-
|bgcolor=whitesmoke|Saint-Laurent
|
|Rachid Bandou
||
|Jean-Marc Fournier
|
|
|
|Hasnaa Kadiri
|
|Jennifer Beaudry
|
|Tidiane Diallo 
|
|Fernand Deschamps (M-L)
Guy Morissette (Cons.)
||
|Jean-Marc Fournier
|-
|bgcolor=whitesmoke|Verdun
|
|Lorraine Pintal
||
|Jacques Daoust
|
|Benoit Richer
|
|Rosa Pires
|
|Julien Longchamp
|
|Antonin Bergeron-Bossé 
|
|Raynald St-Onge (Pot)
Eileen Studd (M-L)
||
|Henri-François Gautrin
|-
|bgcolor=whitesmoke|Westmount–Saint-Louis
|
|Denise Laroche
||
|Jacques Chagnon
|
|
|
|Mélissa Desjardins
|
|
|
|Lisa Julie Cahn 
|
|David Gerard (Cons.)
||
|Jacques Chagnon
|}

Outaouais

|-
|bgcolor=whitesmoke|Chapleau
|
|Yves Morin
||
|Marc Carrière
|
|Carl Pelletier
|
|Laura Avalos
|
|Philippe Boily
|
|Roger Fleury (Green)
Pierre Soublière (M-L)
||
|Marc Carrière
|-
|bgcolor=whitesmoke|Gatineau
|
|Cédric Sarault
||
|Stéphanie Vallée
|
|André Paradis
|
|Alexis Harvey
|
|Marcel Vaive
|
|Alexandre Deschênes (M-L)
||
|Stéphanie Vallée
|-
|bgcolor=whitesmoke|Hull
|
|Gilles Aubé
||
|Maryse Gaudreault
|
|Jean Bosco Citegetse
|
|Benoît Renaud
|
|Eid Harb
|
|Gabriel Girard Bernier (M-L)
||
|Maryse Gaudreault
|-
|bgcolor=whitesmoke|Papineau
|
|Jean-François Primeau
||
|Alexandre Iracà
|
|René Langelier
|
|Marc Sarazin
|
|Jonathan Beauchamp
|
|Christine Gagné (Nul)
||
|Alexandre Iracá
|-
|bgcolor=whitesmoke|Pontiac
|
|Maryse Vallières-Murray
||
|André Fortin
|
|Michel Mongeon
|
|Charmain Levy
|
|
|
|Louis Lang (M-L)
||
|Charlotte L'Écuyer
|}

Abitibi-Témiscamingue and Nord-du-Québec

|-
|bgcolor=whitesmoke|Abitibi-Est
|
|Élizabeth Larouche
||
|Guy Bourgeois
|
|Sylvain Martel
|
|Valérie Dufour
|
|Richard Trudel
|
|Maxym Perron-Tellier (Cons.)
||
|Élizabeth Larouche
|-
|bgcolor=whitesmoke|Abitibi-Ouest
||
|François Gendron
|
|Serge Bastien
|
|Nadia Racine
|
|Ghislaine Camirand
|
|Grégory Vézeau
|
|
||
|François Gendron
|-
|bgcolor=whitesmoke|Rouyn-Noranda–Témiscamingue
|
|Gilles Chapadeau
||
|Luc Blanchette
|
|Bernard Flébus
|
|Guy Leclerc
|
|Ghislain Dallaire
|
|
||
|Gilles Chapadeau
|-
|bgcolor=whitesmoke|Ungava
|
|Luc Ferland
||
|Jean Boucher
|
|Michael Cameron
|
|André Richer
|
|Zoé Allen-Mercier
|
|Matthew Guillemette (Nul)
||
|Luc Ferland
|}

Chaudière-Appalaches and Centre-du-Québec

|-
|bgcolor=whitesmoke|Arthabaska
|
|Gaëtan St-Arnaud
|
|Luc Dastous
||
|Sylvie Roy
|
|Christine Letendre
|
|
|
|Jean Landry
|
|François Fillion (Green)
||
|Sylvie Roy
|-
|bgcolor=whitesmoke|Beauce-Nord
|
|Olivier Pouliot-Audet
|
|José Couture
||
|André Spénard
|
|Mathieu Dumont
|
|Lorenzo Tessier-Moreau
|
|Éric Couture
|
|Benoît Roy (Ind.)
||
|André Spénard
|-
|bgcolor=whitesmoke|Beauce-Sud
|
|Alex Gagnon Lacroix
||
|Robert Dutil
|
|Samuel Poulin
|
|Diane Vincent
|
|Vanessa Roy 
|
|Stéphane Bégin
|
|Robert Genesse (QRD)
Jean Paquet (MPLQ)
||
|Robert Dutil
|-
|bgcolor=whitesmoke|Bellechasse
|
|Linda Goupil
||
|Dominique Vien
|
|Stéphanie Lachance
|
|Benoit Comeau
|
|Mathilde Lefebvre
|
|Patrice Aubin
|
|
||
|Dominique Vien
|-
|bgcolor=whitesmoke|Chutes-de-la-Chaudière
|
|Catherine Paré
|
|Ghyslain Vaillancourt
||
|Marc Picard
|
|Olivier Bolduc
|
|Alexis Lévesque-Morin
|
|Benoit Cloutier
|
|Dave Gagné (PDSP)
||
|Marc Picard
|-
|bgcolor=whitesmoke|Drummond–Bois-Francs
|
|Daniel Lebel
|
|Isabelle Chabot
||
|Sébastien Schneeberger
|
|Francis Soulard
|
|Alexandre Phénix
|
|François Picard
|
|Frédéric Bélanger (Nul)
||
|Sébastien Schneeberger
|-
|bgcolor=whitesmoke|Johnson
|
|Yves-François Blanchet
|
|Brigitte Mercier
||
|André Lamontagne
|
|François Desrochers
|
|Magali Doucet
|
|Benoit Lussier
|
|Sébastien Gauthier (Nul)
||
|Yves-François Blanchet
|-
|bgcolor=whitesmoke|Lévis
|
|Sylvie Girard
|
|Simon Turmel
||
|Christian Dubé
|
|Yv Bonnier Viger
|
|Nicolas Belley
|
|Sébastien Roy
|
|Paul Biron (UN)
||
|Christian Dubé
|-
|bgcolor=whitesmoke|Lotbinière-Frontenac
|
|Kaven Mathieu
||
|Laurent Lessard
|
|Luc de la Sablonnière
|
|Nadia Blouin
|
|Annie Grégoire-Gauthier
|
|Sylvain Rancourt
|
|Denis Cadieux (MPLQ)
Rodrigue Leblanc (Ind.)
||
|Laurent Lessard
|-
|bgcolor=whitesmoke|Nicolet-Bécancour
|
|Jean-René Dubois
|
|Denis Vallée
||
|Donald Martel
|
|Marc Dion
|
|Marjolaine Lachapelle
|
|Guillaume Laquerre
|
|
||
|Donald Martel
|}

Laval

|-
|bgcolor=whitesmoke|Chomedey
|
|Jean Cooke
||
|Guy Ouellette
|
|Carlie Dejoie
|
|Lise-Anne Rheaume
|
|Patrick Simard
|
|Brendan Edge (Green)
Emily Gagnon (Pot)
Nick Keramarios (Cons.)
||
|Guy Ouellette
|-
|bgcolor=whitesmoke|Fabre
|
|François-Gycelain Rocque
||
|Gilles Ouimet
|
|Christopher Skeete
|
|Marie-Claire Des Rochers-Lamarche
|
|Bernard Paré
|
|
||
|Gilles Ouimet
|-
|bgcolor=whitesmoke|Laval-des-Rapides
|
|Léo Bureau-Blouin
||
|Saul Polo
|
|Vincent Bolduc
|
|Nicolas Chatel-Launay
|
|David Voyer
|
|Léo McKenna (Green)
||
|Léo Bureau-Blouin
|-
|bgcolor=whitesmoke|Mille-Îles
|
|Djemila Benhabib
||
|Francine Charbonneau
|
|Sylvain Loranger
|
|Anik Paradis
|
|Maël Rieussec
|
|Bianca Jitaru (Green)
David Mirabella (Cons.)
||
|Francine Charbonneau
|-
|bgcolor=whitesmoke|Sainte-Rose
|
|Suzanne Proulx
||
|Jean Habel
|
|Domenico Cavaliere
|
|André da Silva Pereira
|
|Bruno Forget
|
|
||
|Suzanne Proulx
|-
|bgcolor=whitesmoke|Vimont
|
|Jean Poirier
||
|Jean Rousselle
|
|Joseph Dydzak
|
|Janina Moran
|
|Étienne Boily
|
|Jean-Marc Boyer (Ind.)
Andréanne Demers (Green)
Alain Robert (Cons.)
||
|Jean Rousselle
|}

Lanaudière

|-
|bgcolor=whitesmoke|Berthier
||
|André Villeneuve
|
|Pierre-Luc Bellerose
|
|Elizabeth Leclerc
|
|Louise Beaudry
|
|Francis Lamarre
|
|
|
|Pierre Baril (Green)
Claude Dupré (MPLQ)
||
|André Villeneuve
|-
|bgcolor=whitesmoke|Joliette
||
|Véronique Hivon
|
|Robert Corriveau
|
|Denise Larouche
|
|Flavie Trudel
|
|Sylvain Legault
|
|Mikey Colangelo Lauzon
|
|
||
|Véronique Hivon
|-
|bgcolor=whitesmoke|L'Assomption
|
|Pierre Paquette
|
|Jean-Marc Bergevin
||
|François Legault
|
|Sylvain Fournier
|
|Gabriel Gauthier
|
|Charles-Étienne Raynault
|
|
||
|François Legault
|-
|bgcolor=whitesmoke|Masson
|
|Diane Hamelin
|
|Wenet Féné
||
|Mathieu Lemay
|
|Joëlle St-Pierre
|
|Pierre-Alexandre Bugeaud
|
|Éric Giroux
|
|
||
|Diane Hamelin
|-
|bgcolor=whitesmoke|Repentigny
|
|Scott McKay
|
|Robert Nantel
||
|Lise Lavallée
|
|Olivier Huard
|
|Christian Strasbourg
|
|Pierre Lacombe
|
|
||
|Scott McKay
|-
|bgcolor=whitesmoke|Rousseau
||
|Nicolas Marceau
|
|Mario Racette
|
|Claude Charette
|
|François Lépine
|
|Chantal St-Onge
|
|
|
|
||
|Nicolas Marceau
|-
|bgcolor=whitesmoke|Terrebonne
||
|Mathieu Traversy
|
|Meriem Glia
|
|Jean-François Jarry
|
|Yan Smith
|
|Jean-François Jacob
|
|
|
|
||
|Mathieu Traversy
|}

Laurentides

|-
|bgcolor=whitesmoke|Argenteuil
|
|Roland Richer
||
|Yves St-Denis
|
|Nicole Chouinard
|
|Clotilde Bertrand
|
|Samuel Cloutier
|
|Serge Dupré (MPLQ)
Rouge Lefebvre (Green)
||
|Roland Richer
|-
|bgcolor=whitesmoke|Bertrand
||
|Claude Cousineau
|
|Isabelle Leblond
|
|Robert Milot
|
|Lucie Mayer
|
|Diane Massicotte
|
|Patrick Dubé (Nul)
Mario Roy (Ind.)
||
|Claude Cousineau
|-
|bgcolor=whitesmoke|Blainville
|
|Gyslaine Desrosiers
|
|Marie-Claude Collin
||
|Mario Laframboise
|
|Annie Giguère
|
|
|
|Jean-Philippe Fournier (Cons.)
||
|Daniel Ratthé
|-
|bgcolor=whitesmoke|Deux-Montagnes
|
|Daniel Goyer
|
|Luc Leclerc
||
|Benoit Charette
|
|Duncan Hart Cameron
|
|Louis-Félix Cauchon
|
|Alec Ware (Équit.)
Delia Fodor (Cons.)
||
|Daniel Goyer
|-
|bgcolor=whitesmoke|Groulx
|
|Martine Desjardins
|
|Vicki Emard
||
|Claude Surprenant
|
|Sylvie Giguère
|
|Alain Marginean
|
|Jonathan Davis (Nul)
||
|Hélène Daneault
|-
|bgcolor=whitesmoke|Labelle
||
|Sylvain Pagé
|
|Christian Lacroix
|
|Cédrick Rémy-Quevedo
|
|Gabriel Dagenais
|
|Philippe Richard-Léonard
|
|
||
|Sylvain Pagé
|-
|bgcolor=whitesmoke|Mirabel
|
|Denise Beaudoin
|
|Ismaël Boisvert
||
|Sylvie D'Amours
|
|Mylène Jaccoud
|
|Curtis Jean-Louis
|
|Andre Linskiy (Cons.)
||
|Denise Beaudoin
|-
|bgcolor=whitesmoke|Saint-Jérôme
||
|Pierre Karl Péladeau
|
|Armand Dubois
|
|Patrice Charbonneau
|
|Vincent Lemay-Thivierge
|
|Mathieu Trottier-Kavanagh
|
|Bruno Morin (Cons.)
||
|Jacques Duchesneau
|}

Montérégie

Eastern

|-
|bgcolor=whitesmoke|Borduas
|
|Pierre Duchesne
|
|Jean Murray
||
|Simon Jolin-Barrette
|
|Jean Falardeau
|
|Marc-Olivier Siouï
|
|Gilbert Gour
|
|Michel Lepage (PI)
||
|Pierre Duchesne
|-
|bgcolor=whitesmoke|Brome-Missisquoi
|
|René Beauregard
||
|Pierre Paradis
|
|François Lemay
|
|Benoit Van Caloen
|
|Nicolas Pepin
|
|
|
|
||
|Pierre Paradis
|-
|bgcolor=whitesmoke|Chambly
|
|Bertrand St-Arnaud
|
|Magdala Ferdinand
||
|Jean-François Roberge
|
|Francis Vigeant
|
|Martin Laramée
|
|Michael Maher
|
|Vincent Dessureault (Nul)
Mary Harper (Green)
||
|Bertrand St-Arnaud
|-
|bgcolor=whitesmoke|Granby
|
|Joanne Lalumière
|
|Pascal Proulx
||
|François Bonnardel
|
|André Beauregard
|
|Jocelyn Beaudoin
|
|
|
|Stéphane Deschamps (Nul)
||
|François Bonnardel
|-
|bgcolor=whitesmoke|Iberville
|
|Marie Bouillé
|
|Chantal Tremblay
||
|Claire Samson
|
|Myriam-Zaa Normandin
|
|Claude Savard
|
|
|
|
||
|Marie Bouillé
|-
|bgcolor=whitesmoke|Richelieu
||
|Élaine Zakaïb
|
|Alain Plante
|
|Martin Baller
|
|Marie-Ève Mathieu
|
|Jean-François Tremblay
|
|Marc Gaudet
|
|Claude Bourgault (Green)
||
|Élaine Zakaïb
|-
|bgcolor=whitesmoke|Saint-Hyacinthe
|
|Émilien Pelletier
|
|Louise Arpin
||
|Chantal Soucy
|
|Danielle Pelland
|
|Éric Pothier
|
|Simon Labbé
|
|
||
|Émilien Pelletier
|-
|bgcolor=whitesmoke|Saint-Jean
||
|Dave Turcotte
|
|Marie-Josée Denis
|
|Serge Tremblay
|
|Carole Lusignan
|
|Jade Bossé Bélanger
|
|Maryse Grenier
|
|
||
|Dave Turcotte
|-
|bgcolor=whitesmoke|Verchères
||
|Stéphane Bergeron
|
|Simon Rocheleau
|
|Yves Renaud
|
|Céline Jarrousse
|
|Mathieu Coulombe
|
|
|
|
||
|Stéphane Bergeron
|}

South Shore

|-
|bgcolor=whitesmoke|Beauharnois
||
|Guy Leclair
|
|Lyse Lemieux
|
|Claude Moreau
|
|Pierre-Paul St-Onge
|
|Florence Rousseau
|
|Julie De Bellefeuille
|
|Yves de Repentigny (Équit.)
Victoria Haliburton (Green)
Sylvain Larocque (Ind.)
||
|Guy Leclair
|-
|bgcolor=whitesmoke|Châteauguay
|
|Laurent Pilon
||
|Pierre Moreau
|
|Claudia Cloutier
|
|Xavier P.-Laberge
|
|Vincent Masse
|
|Claude Chalhoub
|
|François Mailly (QCU)
Linda Sullivan (M-L)
||
|Pierre Moreau
|-
|bgcolor=whitesmoke|Huntingdon
|
|Huguette Hébert
||
|Stéphane Billette
|
|Claire IsaBelle
|
|Carmen Labelle
|
|Yann Labrie
|
|Albert De Martin
|
|Louis-Paul Bourdon (PDSP)
||
|Stéphane Billette
|-
|bgcolor=whitesmoke|La Pinière
|
|
||
|Gaétan Barrette
|
|Jin Kim
|
|Johane Beaupré
|
|François Létourneau-Prézeau
|
|Sebastian Fernandez
|
|Fatima Houda-Pepin (Ind.)
||
|Fatima Houda-Pepin
|-
|bgcolor=whitesmoke|Laporte
|
|Sophie Stanké
||
|Nicole Ménard
|
|Donald LeBlanc
|
|Michèle St-Denis
|
|Linda Dupuis
|
|Christian Godin
|
|Marcel Baril (Green)
||
|Nicole Ménard
|-
|bgcolor=whitesmoke|La Prairie
|
|Pierre Langlois
||
|Richard Merlini
|
|Stéphane Le Bouyonnec
|
|Marilou André
|
|Jean-Pierre Gouin
|
|Guy L'Heureux
|
|Normand Chouinard (M-L)
||
|Stéphane Le Bouyonnec
|-
|bgcolor=whitesmoke|Marie-Victorin
||
|Bernard Drainville
|
|Jean-Guy Tremblay
|
|Guillaume Provencher
|
|Carl Lévesque
|
|Fabien Villemaire
|
|
|
|Pierre Chénier (M-L)
Catherine Lovatt-Smith (Green)
Florent Portron (Auto.)
||
|Bernard Drainville
|-
|bgcolor=whitesmoke|Montarville
|
|Simon Prévost
|
|Jacques Gendron
||
|Nathalie Roy
|
|Jean-Marc Ostiguy
|
|Anthony van Duyse
|
|
|
|
||
|Nathalie Roy
|-
|bgcolor=whitesmoke|Sanguinet
||
|Alain Therrien
|
|Jean Paul Pellerin
|
|Denis Leftakis
|
|Christian Laramée
|
|Robert Moreau
|
|Alexandre Dagenais
|
|Hélène Héroux (M-L)
||
|Alain Therrien
|-
|bgcolor=whitesmoke|Soulanges
|
|Marie-Louise Séguin
||
|Lucie Charlebois
|
|
|
|Andrée Bessette
|
|Patrick Marquis
|
|
|
|Patricia Domingos (Équit.)
||
|Lucie Charlebois
|-
|bgcolor=whitesmoke|Taillon
||
|Diane Lamarre
|
|Maxime Tessier
|
|Sébastien Vaillancourt
|
|Manon Blanchard
|
|Éric Gervais-Després
|
|
|
|
||
|Marie Malavoy
|-
|bgcolor=whitesmoke|Vachon
||
|Martine Ouellet
|
|Michel Bienvenu
|
|Stéphane Robichaud
|
|Sébastien Robert
|
|Josée Létourneau
|
|
|
|Hugo Boutin-Sinotte (Pot)
||
|Martine Ouellet
|-
|bgcolor=whitesmoke|Vaudreuil
|
|Marcos Archambault
||
|Marie-Claude Nichols
|
|Luc Tison
|
|David Fortin Côté
|
|Jean-Gabriel Cauchon
|
|Michel Paul
|
|Léon Dupré (MPLQ)
Julien Leclerc (Équit.)
Thomas Radcliffe (Green)
||
|Yvon Marcoux
|}

Media endorsements
Parti Québécois
Le Devoir

Quebec Liberal Party
La Presse
Montreal Gazette

See also
 40th Quebec Legislature
 Politics of Quebec
 List of premiers of Quebec
 List of leaders of the Official Opposition (Quebec)
 National Assembly of Quebec
 Timeline of Quebec history
 Political parties in Quebec

References

External links
Chief Electoral Officer of Quebec (DGE)

Quebec general election
Elections in Quebec
General election
Quebec general election